Uncertain Glory is a 2017 Spanish drama film directed by Agustí Villaronga based on the eponymous novel by Joan Sales. Shot in Catalan, its cast is led by Marcel Borràs, Núria Prims, Oriol Pla and Bruna Cusí.

Plot 
Set in 1937, with the backdrop of the Spanish Civil War, a young Republican officer becomes infatuated with a mysterious widow.

Cast

Production 
Based on the eponymous novel by Joan Sales, Uncertain Glory was written by the director Agustí Villaronga alongside Coral Cruz. Isona Passola took over production duties. It was shot in 2016. Filming primarily took place in Aragon, as well as La Garriga and Barcelona.

Release 
Distributed by Alfa Pictures, the film was theatrically released on 17 March 2017.

Reception 
Quim Casas of El Periódico de Catalunya rated the film with 4 out of 5 stars, considering that Villaronga "splendidly directs" the cast, Núria Prims in particular. He deemed the war setting to have a secondary role in the plot, just as a device to switch everything else on: "a trail of conflicting feelings, affective hostilities, devastating sexual impulses, delusions, hatreds and quarrels, the seed of evil in its purest form".

Reviewing for Fotogramas, Pere Vall gave the film 4 out of 5 stars, deeming Oriol Pla's emotional performance to be the best about the film while noting as a negative point that the plot featured some trip to Barcelona that could have dealt with as an ellipsis.

Toni Vall of Cinemanía scored 4 out of 5 stars, considering that the story tracking the five main characters "manages to transcend the purely historical sketch, taking possession of their souls, dissecting them and injecting cinema into them".

Javier Ocaña of El País deemed Uncertain Glory to be an "unquestionable" heir to Pa negre, a "fantastic production set in the rearguard of the Civil War", praising, in addition of Villaronga's craft, the cinematography, the production design, the "very risky" score and the cast.

Awards and nominations 

|-
| align = "center" rowspan = "20" | 2018 || rowspan = "2" | 5th Feroz Awards || Best Actress (film) || Núria Prims ||  || rowspan = "2" | 
|-
| Best Supporting Actor (film) || Oriol Pla ||  
|-
| rowspan = "16" | 10th Gaudí Awards || colspan = "2" | Best Film ||  || rowspan = "16" | 
|-
| Best Direction || Agustí Villaronga || 
|-
| Best Leading Actress || Núria Prims || 
|-
| Best Leading Actor || Marcel Borràs || 
|-
| Best Supporting Actress || Bruna Cusí || 
|-
| Best Supporting Actor || Oriol Pla || 
|-
| Best Screenplay || || 
|-
| Best Production Supervision || Aleix Castellón || 
|-
| Best Art Direction || || 
|-
| Best Editing || || 
|-
| Best Original Score || || 
|-
| Best Cinematography || Josep M. Civit || 
|-
| Best Costume Design || Mercè Paloma || 
|-
| Best Sound || Xavier Mas, Fernando Novillo & Ricard Galceran || 
|-
| Best Visual Effects || Manuel López Egea & Bernat Aragonés || 
|-
| Best Makeup and Hairstyles || Alma Casal || 
|-
| 32nd Goya Awards || Best Adapted Screenplay || Agustí Villaronga & Coral Cruz ||  || 
|-
| 27th Actors and Actresses Union Awards || Best Film Actor in a Minor Role || Jorge Usón ||  || 
|}

See also 
 List of Spanish films of 2017

References

External links 
 Uncertain Glory at ICAA's Catálogo de Cinespañol

2017 films
2010s Catalan-language films
Spanish drama films
Spanish Civil War films
Films shot in Spain
Films set in 1937
Films set in Spain
Films based on Spanish novels
2010s Spanish films
Films directed by Agustí Villaronga